Gunay Israil qizi Mehdizade (born June 18, 1981) is an Azerbaijani painter and a member of Union of Artists of Azerbaijan. She is the author and organizer of Bursa Zeki Müren Fine Arts Lyceum and "Brother School" project of the Art Gymnasium within the National Conservatory of Azerbaijan, as well as author of portrait of Atatürk, exhibited at the house-museum of Atatürk in Ankara.

Biography 
Gunay Mehdizade was born on June 18, 1981 in Baku. She is the student of Honored Artist of Azerbaijan, Beyimhanim Hajizade. In 2011 she was admitted into Union of Artists of Azerbaijan. In 2012, Mehdizade's "National Dishes" work was added to the World Children's Encyclopedia. The same year, her "Nowruz" art was included on "History and Personality in Fine Art of Azerbaijan" book. 

In 2013, Mehdizade, the winner of an international competition, represented Azerbaijan at the 4th International Symposium on International Live Painting in Turkey. Her works were displayed at the exhibition of young Azerbaijani artists in Milan in 2013. Her "Pomegranate" work, created in 2014 at the symposium, is exhibited at the Modern Museum of Konya.

Gunay Mehdizade's "Atatürk Portrait" has been exhibited in Ankara at house-museum of Atatürk since 2015 and is regarded as the wealth of the Turkish Republic. She represented culture, art and relationship between Azerbaijan and Turkey in May 2017, as an artist-curator in the "Brotherhood of Colors" project, in collaboration with the Izmir Balçova Municipality and the Fraternity Cooperation Association.

In 2016-2017, Mehdizade worked particularly on the field of historical arts. On the 25th anniversary of independence of Azerbaijan, she created a portrait of Heydar Aliyev. She later created the works of "Atatürk Period", "Modern Turkey", "Khojaly genocide". Mehdizade is the author of the idea and organizer of "Brothers School" project within Zeki Müren Fine Arts Lyceum in Bursa and Art Gymnasium, chief curator of cultural relations project between Azerbaijan and Turkey.

References

External links 
 Əsəri Türkiyə
 Gunay Mehdizade Ministry of Culture of the Republic of Azerbaijan

Living people
1981 births
Azerbaijani women painters
21st-century Azerbaijani painters
21st-century Azerbaijani women artists
Artists from Baku